The London Borough of Bromley in Greater London, England has over one hundred parks and open spaces within its boundaries: some large, like Crystal Palace Park, and some small, such as recreation grounds. Some of the open spaces form part of the South East London Green Chain. As a borough in Outer London it also contains some open countryside in the form of country parks.

The main open spaces under control of the borough are:

In addition there are many other open spaces privately controlled; among them are:
 North of the borough: Cator Park and many sports grounds in New Beckenham; Sundridge Park including its golf course; Camden Park, Scadbury Park and Elmstead Wood near Chislehurst;
 East of the borough: Ruxley Wood, Paul's Cray Hill Park, Hockenden Wood and Bourne Wood, all in the Green Belt area;
 West of the borough: a large open space around Bethlem Royal Hospital, including farmland and Crouch Oak Wood.
 Saltbox Hill, Site of Special Scientific Importance in Biggin Hill owned and managed by the London Wildlife Trust

References

External links
Bromley London Borough Council - Details of all open spaces
Bromley Friends Forum - Details of Friends Groups across Bromley